Trichloronitrosomethane is a chlorinated nitrosoalkane. It is a deep blue liquid with powerful lachrymatory effects.

Synthesis
Trichloronitrosomethane can be produced with following methods:
 Oxidation of trichloromethylsulfinic acid with nitric acid.
 Reaction of sodium trichloromethylsulfinate with sodium nitrite and sodium nitrate or potassium nitrate in sulfuric acid.
 Pyrolysis of trichloroacethydroxamic acid.

Chemistry
Trichloronitrosomethane is an unstable substance. It slowly decomposes into nitrosyl chloride, nitrogen oxides, and chloropicrin over time.

Trichloronitrosomethane can be reduced to phosgene oxime by hydrogen sulfide.

See also
Chloropicrin
Trifluoronitrosomethane
Phosgene oxime

References

Nitroso compounds
Trichloromethyl compounds
Lachrymatory agents
Pulmonary agents